The spotted tentiform leafminer (Phyllonorycter blancardella) is a moth of the family Gracillariidae. It is known from all of Europe, east to Ukraine and central Anatolia. It is also known throughout North America including Nova Scotia, Quebec, Ontario, Wisconsin and California.

The wingspan is 6–9 mm. The ground colour is orange often with a dusky sprinkling of blackish scales. White streaks sometimes join together to form larger markings. 

Adults emerge in May and again in August in two generations in western Europe.

The larvae feed on Malus angustifolia, Malus x astracanica, Malus baccata, Malus coronaria, Malus domestica, Malus floribunda, Malus fusca, Malus ringo, Malus x robusta and Malus sylvestris. They mine the leaves of their host plant. The mine has the form of a lower surface tentiform mine. The epidermis is yellow-green and has some folds. Pupation takes place within the mine. The pupa is amber or chestnut brown, and is made within a white cocoon.

Control
The spotted tentiform leafminer is a serious pest of various apple species (Malus), along with the apple blotch leafminer moth (Phyllonorycter crataegella) and others. Infestation may result in reduced crop yield. Both species, like many other pests, show an increasing resistance to organophosphate and synthetic pyrethroid insecticides.

Two species of very small wasps, the eulophid Sympiesis marylandensis and the braconid Pholetesor ornigis are parasites of both P. blancardella and P. crataegella. Biological control includes reducing the use of broad spectrum insecticides, helping these and other parasitoids to flourish and reduce leaf miner damage. Mulching fallen leaves may also allow fragments to be pulled underground by earthworms.

References

External links
 bladmineerders.nl
 UKmoths 

blancardella
Leaf miners
Moths described in 1781
Moths of Asia
Moths of Europe
Moths of North America
Taxa named by Johan Christian Fabricius